The 2010–11 Gonzaga Bulldogs men's basketball team represented Gonzaga University in the 2010–11 NCAA Division I men's basketball season. The Bulldogs are members of the West Coast Conference, and were led by head coach Mark Few. They played their home games at the McCarthey Athletic Center on the university campus in Spokane, Washington.

The team lost the 2010 WCC Player of the Year Matt Bouldin to graduation, but returned the rest of their starting lineup. Three of the returning players participated in the 2010 FIBA World Championship in Turkey—Elias Harris for Germany and Kelly Olynyk and Robert Sacre for Canada. Gonzaga was the only NCAA school with more than one player involved in the 2010 Worlds.

The Bulldogs finished the 2010–11 season 25–10, 11–3 in WCC play to share the regular season championship with Saint Mary's. They defeated Saint Mary's in the championship game of the 2011 West Coast Conference men's basketball tournament to earn an automatic bid in the 2011 NCAA Division I men's basketball tournament. As the 11 seed in the southeast region, they defeated 6 seed St. John's in the second round before falling to 3 seed Brigham Young in the third round.

Preseason
In 2010–11, the Gonzaga Bulldogs men's basketball team were in their 31st season as a member of the West Coast Conference. Since 2004, the team has played their home games at the McCarthey Athletic Center, which has a capacity of 6,000. In their previous season, a West Coast Conference Preseason poll predicted that the Gonzaga Bulldogs would finish first in the conference.

Departures

Incoming transfers

2010 recruiting class

Roster

Rankings

Schedule

|-
!colspan=9| Exhibition

|-
!colspan=9| Regular Season

|-
!colspan=9| 2011 West Coast Conference men's basketball tournament

|-

|-
!colspan=9| 2011 NCAA Division I men's basketball tournament

|-

|-

References

Gonzaga
Gonzaga Bulldogs men's basketball seasons
Gonzaga
Gonzaga Bulldogs men's basketball
Gonzaga Bulldogs men's basketball